MOTIV Bowling is an American company involved in the manufacture and sale of bowling balls. The company headquarters are in Spring Lake, Michigan, with the main manufacturing facility in nearby Muskegon Heights.

History
MOTIV had its beginnings in the 1990s as Wilbur Products, a company that engineered cores for other high-performance bowling ball brands. When its largest customer (Brunswick) chose to move its manufacturing from Michigan to Mexico, Wilbur Products embarked on a project to start its own bowling ball production, launching the MOTIV brand in 2009.

Patents
MOTIV patented a process called NeoMark[TM], which integrates logos and other graphics into the cover stock of the ball. (Other bowling ball manufacturers use etching or engraving for logos and graphics.)

Current company
MOTIV continues to operate out of the Muskegon, MI area, and employs approximately 65 people. It has become a notable high-performance brand among league, tournament and professional players, and is now one of four parent companies (with Storm, Brunswick and BIG Bowling) producing balls authorized for use on the PBA and PWBA Tours.

MOTIV-sponsored professional bowlers
MOTIV has produced many bowling balls used in the sport by competitive players, and has several sponsorship agreements on both the PBA and PWBA Tours.

List of notable players as of January, 2023:

Dick Allen
Andrew Anderson
A. J. Johnson
Chris Loschetter
Sean Lavery-Spahr
Wesley Low
Erin McCarthy
Maria José Rodriguez
Tom Smallwood
E. J. Tackett
Santtu Tahvanainen

References

Ten-pin bowling equipment manufacturers